Highland English is the variety of Scottish English spoken by many in the Scottish Highlands and the Hebrides. It is more strongly influenced by Gaelic than are other forms of Scottish English.

Phonology

The svarabhakti ("helping vowel") that is used in some consonant combinations in Gaelic and Scots is sometimes used in the Hebrides, so that "film" may be pronounced "fillum".

References

Sources

 Sabban, Annette (1982), Sprachkontakt: zur Variabilität des Englischen im gälischsprachigen Gebiet Schottlands ; eine empirische Studie, Heidelberg: Groos.
 Watson, Murray (2003) Being English in Scotland. Edinburgh University Press.

See also
 Lowland Scots

Other English dialects influenced by Celtic languages
 Anglo-Cornish
 Anglo-Manx
 Bungi creole
 Hiberno-English
 Welsh English

 
Highlands and Islands of Scotland
Scottish culture
Dialects of English
Culture in Highland (council area)
Culture in Argyll and Bute